Triple Island Lighthouse is a large, manned light station on Triple Island. Built in 1920 after four years of construction, the concrete station features a  tower attached to a rectangular concrete structure that houses the keepers' quarters and machinery. A Triple Island helipad  occupies much of the remainder of the islet. Canadian Coast Guard personnel man the station on a 28-day rotation. The station was designated a National Historic Site of Canada in 1974.

From 1939 to 1970, the Triple Island lightstation was part of the British Columbia Shore Station Oceanographic Program, collecting coastal water temperature and salinity measurements for the Department of Fisheries and Oceans everyday for 31 years.

See also
 List of lighthouses in British Columbia
 List of lighthouses in Canada

References

External links
 Aids to Navigation Canadian Coast Guard
 Triple Island Lightstation at fogwhistle.ca
 Triple Island

Lighthouses completed in 1920
Lighthouses in British Columbia
National Historic Sites in British Columbia
Lighthouses on the National Historic Sites of Canada register